Emma Foy (born 6 April 1989) is a New Zealand para-cyclist. She represented New Zealand at the 2016 Summer Paralympics in Rio de Janeiro, where she won a silver and a bronze medal with sighted pilot Laura Thompson.

From 2013 to 2019, she won a total of thirteen medals (including five gold) at the UCI Para-cycling Track and Road Championships.

In 2020, with sighted pilot Hannah van Kampen, Foy retained the world title in the women's individual pursuit tandem at the UCI Para-cycling Track World Championships. They also claimed the bronze medal in the women's time trail tandem.

Foy was born with oculocutaneous albinism. Of Māori descent, she affiliates to the Ngāpuhi iwi.

References

External links
  (archive)
 

1989 births
Living people
New Zealand female cyclists
Paralympic cyclists of New Zealand
Cyclists at the 2016 Summer Paralympics
Medalists at the 2016 Summer Paralympics
Paralympic silver medalists for New Zealand
Paralympic bronze medalists for New Zealand
New Zealand Māori sportspeople
Ngāpuhi people
Paralympic medalists in cycling